Stringtown is a ghost town in Tucker County, West Virginia, United States.

References

Geography of Tucker County, West Virginia
Ghost towns in West Virginia